Susan Morrow (born Jacqueline Ann Teresa Bernadette Immoor, May 25, 1932 – May 8, 1985) was an American actress.

Early years
Born as Jacqueline Ann Teresa Bernadette Immoor to Frederick W. Immoor and Katherine (Shea) Immoor, Susan Morrow was the elder sister of Judith Exner. Her family moved to North Hollywood, California, when she was 13. She graduated from North Hollywood High School.

Career 
Morrow's screen debut came in Gasoline Alley (1951). She co-starred with Charlton Heston in a 1952 western film, The Savage.

Her television career lasted only six years from 1954 to 1960.  Among her appearances were two 1955 episodes of The Loretta Young Show, three 1957 episodes of Gunsmoke starring James Arness (as a love interest for Chester Goode) and a 1958 episode of Perry Mason as Arlene Dowling in the title role of "The Case of the Sun Bather's Diary".  In 1960, her three final appearances were on the westerns Bronco, Maverick, and Lawman.

Personal life 
Morrow was the first wife of comedian Gary Morton. They were married in December 1953; the marriage was annulled on July 9, 1957.

She remarried twice. Her second marriage was also unsuccessful, but her third, to Clarence Sheldon Attix Jr., on July 4, 1963, lasted until her death, and they had four children.

Death 
Morrow died on May 8, 1985, 17 days before her 53rd birthday.

Filmography

References
 MSN Movies
1960.     Lawman.   Beldon girl

External links
 
 

1932 births
1985 deaths
Actresses from New Jersey
American film actresses
People from Teaneck, New Jersey
Actresses from San Diego
20th-century American actresses
North Hollywood High School alumni